is a Japanese manga series written and illustrated by Reiko Shimizu. It has been serialized in Melody.

It has been adapted into an anime series, by Madhouse and broadcast in Japan on NTV between April 8, 2008 and September 30, 2008.

Plot
The story takes place five decades from now when brain scanners have been perfected to the point that the government can retrieve up to five years' worth of memories from people's minds — even if they are dead. The investigators of the National Research Institute of Police Science's 9th Forensics Laboratory must weigh the ethical choices in the ultimate invasion of privacy as they delve into people's minds to solve crimes.

Characters 
  , Played by: Toma Ikuta

The Director of Section Nine. He is a young beautiful androgynous man who leads his force with strict but fair rules. He used to be more open but became closed off after having to shoot his best friend. It is later revealed in episodes 12-13 that he saved a man from starvation but this man became obsessed with Maki and became a serial murder who murdered 28 boys while alive before committing suicide and hypnotizing ten other boys to commit suicide (though one survives) as these boys all looked like Maki and he wanted to torture and make them suffer the way he wanted to make Maki suffer because he loved and hated him. Despite being colder and more closed off after this incident, he still ultimately retains a kind heart and good sense of justice and is respected and retains the loyalty of his subordinates as a result. He is initially conscious of Aoki due to his similarities to Katsuhiro, his late best friend but also favors him among the newcomers and grows closer to him throughout the series.

 , Played by: Masaki Okada

The main protagonist. He is a young bespectacled man recently assigned to Section nine. He is kind, earnest and hard working. His ability to read people's lips helps greatly when investigating deaths. He also heavily empathizes with the victims and having to reveal their secrets. He showed romantic interest in Yukiko and later Amachi but Yukiko rejects him despite mutual attraction and Amachi is murdered before anything can come of it.

 , Played by: Haruka Kinami
One of the members of section nine. She is kind and playful and close friends with Maki. She reveals an ability of psychometry, or an ability to hear and feel emotions from objects of strong personal value.  She showed romantic interest in Aoki but nothing came of it as she is murdered in episode 23.

 , Played by: Yusuke Hirayama

One of the older members of Section Nine. He is older and has more experience with some of the darker cases Section nine has to go through. He is married to a designer.

 

A man with a strong sense of justice and is a recent graduate from the police academy. Because he is a newcomer, he tends to be impulsive and needs to gain more experience.

 

A scientist in charge of setting up, programming and monitoring the MRI that connects to the victim's brains and shows the images they saw through their memories during their life. He is the student of Professor Schubert who created the MRI system and best friend of American John Considince a world specialist in bionics who helped him repair the MRI machine after Suzuki shot it. John was killed a week before Onogida himself is murdered after Aoki helps him realize someone was stealing MRI data and selling it elsewhere and Onogida himself uncovers a bigger secret before his untimely death.

 

A technician that works with and monitors the machinery alongside Onogida. She admired Onogida and is particularly heart broken when he dies.

 Played by: Tori Matsuzaka

Maki's best friend whom he was forced to shoot a year and a half prior to the start of the series. He is similar to Aoki in their earnest personalities and the air around them. It is revealed that in order to spare Maki the grief and guilt of having been indirectly responsible for inspiring a man to become a serial murderer, Katsuhiro decided to look at the criminal's mind. However, the mind was so warped with lust towards killing those boys that it drove Katsuhiro insane and, not wanting Maki to see this and be tainted and "infected", destroyed the MRI machine and begged for Maki to shoot him. It is revealed part of the data of Kainuma's memory is missing and it was these files that drove Suzuki insane because by seeing Kainuma's memories Kainuma was able to place a hypnosis spell on Suzuki and anyone who saw the footage, which Suzuki realized and decided must be destroyed so there would be no other victims.

 Played by: Chiaki Kuriyama

Suzuki's lover prior to his death and friend to Maki. She is a 35-year-old formidable woman and doctor/ medical examiner of Section One who has a strange habit of falling asleep on autopsy tables and refers to the deceased as her "lovers". She has bad luck with men. She takes a leave of absence after her carelessness leads her to be infected with a virus and she decides she is getting old and needs a break. She is strong, independent, stubborn to a fault and a formidable opponent with martial arts experience. She is nonetheless kind and devoted to helping others. Aoki falls in love with her but she rejects his advances despite being attracted to him as well due to wanting to treasure her memories of Suzuki.

A stuck up self-centered man who wishes to use MRI to his own benefit and vice Director of Section Nine and leader of the Committee and does not care about the well-being of others, even once sending criminals to suicide as part of an experiment. He constantly clashes with Maki and is ultimately killed in episode 26.

Anime
The anime uses two pieces of theme music.  by ALvino is the opening theme, while  by Maki Chang is the ending theme.

Episode list

Reception
The Himitsu – Top Secret has been recommended by a jury at the 2007 Japan Media Arts Festival and again in 2008, and was awarded the Excellence Award in 2011.

The fourth volume of Himitsu – Top Secret was ranked 4th on the Tohan charts between January 29 and February 4, 2008. The fifth volume of Himitsu – Top Secret was ranked 5th on the Tohan Charts between July 29 and August 4, 2008. The sixth volume of Himitsu – Top Secret was ranked 29th and 23rd between February 24 and March 9, 2008. The seventh volume of Himitsu – Top Secret was ranked 11th on the Tohan charts between October 26 and November 1, 2009, and 28th the following week.

References

External links
Official Hakusensha Himitsu - Top Secret website 
Official NTV Himitsu - Top Secret anime website 
Official VAP Himitsu - Top Secret anime website 

2008 Japanese television series endings
Anime series based on manga
Hakusensha franchises
Hakusensha manga
Madhouse (company)
Nippon TV original programming
Philosophical anime and manga
Science fiction anime and manga
Suspense anime and manga
Josei manga
Japanese science fiction films
Japanese thriller films